Princess Myeongsuk (Hangul: 명숙공주, Hanja: 明淑公主; 1456 - 1482), or Princess Myeongui (Hangul: 명의공주, Hanja: 明懿公主), posthumously honoured as Princess Taean (Hangul: 태안군주, Hanja: 泰安郡主), was a Joseon Princess as the only daughter of Deokjong of Joseon and Queen Insu.

Biography

Early life 
The princess was born on 1456 and was named Yi Gyeong-geun (Hangul: 이경근, Hanja: 李慶根). She was the older sister of the future Seongjong of Joseon and the younger sister of Grand Prince Wolsan.

After her father's death in 1457, the 3rd year of King Sejo's reign, the Princess, along with her mother and brothers lived outside the palace.

Marriage and later life 
On 19 December 1466, she married Hong Sang (홍상) of the Namyang Hong clan who was honoured as Prince Consort Dangyang (당양군).. She later gave birth to a son, Hong Baek-gyeong, in 1471.

In 1470, after her younger brother, Grand Prince Jalsan, ascended the throne, her father was posthumously elevated to King Deokjong (덕종왕, 德宗王) and her mother was honoured as Queen Insu (인수왕비, 仁粹王妃), and later promoted to Queen Dowager (대비, 大妃).

The new King also honoured his sister as Princess Myeongsuk, formally called Princess Myeongui. She died on October 4, 1482, in the 13th year of the reign of her brother, Seongjong of Joseon, and it was reported that he was very sad about her death.

Family 
 Mother - Han Do-san, Queen Sohye of the Cheongju Han clan (소혜왕후 한씨) (7 October 1437 - 11 May 1504)
 Grandfather - Han Hwak, Internal Prince Consort Seowon (서원부원군 한확) (1400/03 - 1456)
 Grandmother - Internal Princess Consort Namyang of the Namyang Hong clan (남양부부인 남양 홍씨) (1403 - 1450)
 Father - Yi Jang, Deokjong of Joseon (조선 덕종) (3 October 1438 - 20 September 1457)
 Grandmother - Queen Jeonghui of the Paepyeong Yun clan (정희왕후 윤씨) (8 October 1418 - 6 May 1483)
 Grandfather - Yi Yu, Sejo of Joseon (조선 세조) (2 November 1417 - 23 September 1463)
 Siblings
 Older brother - Yi Jeong, Grand Prince Wolsan (월산대군 정) (1454 - 1488)
 Sister-in-law - Grand Internal Princess Consort Seungpyeong of the Suncheon Park clan (승평부대부인 순천 박씨) (1455 - 20 July 1506)
 Sister-in-law - Princess Consort Kim of the Wonju Kim clan (부부인 원주 김씨)
 Nephew - Yi Yi, Prince Deokpung (덕풍군 이이) (August 1485 - 26 March 1506)
 Younger brother - Yi Hyeol, Seongjong of Joseon (조선 성종) (19 August 1457 - 19 January 1495)
 Sister-in-law - Han Song-yi, Queen Gonghye of the Cheongju Han clan (송이 공혜왕후 한씨) (8 November 1456 - 30 April 1474)
 Sister-in-law - Queen Jeheon of the Haman Yun clan (제헌왕후 윤씨) (15 July 1455 - 29 August 1482)
 Nephew - Yi Yong, Yeonsangun of Joseon (조선 연산군) (23 November 1476 - 20 November 1506)
 Unnamed nephew (대군) (? - 1479)
 Sister-in-law - Yun Chang-nyeon, Queen Jeonghyeon of the Paepyeong Yun clan (정현왕후 윤씨) (21 July 1462 - 13 September 1530)
 Niece - Princess Sunsuk (순숙공주) (1478/79 - 1488)
 Unnamed niece (공주) (1485 - 1486)
 Nephew - Yi Yeok, Jungjong of Joseon (조선 중종) (16 April 1488 - 29 November 1544)
 Unnamed niece (공주) (1490 - 1490)
 Husband - Hong Sang, Lord Danyang (당양위 홍상) (1457 - 1513)
 Father-in-law - Hong Eung, Internal Prince Ikseong (익성부원군 홍응) (1428 - 1492)
 Mother-in-law - Lady Lee of the Anseong Lee clan (정경부인 안성 이씨)
 Aunt-in-law - Royal Noble Consort Suk of the Namyang Hong clan (숙빈 홍씨) (1418 - ?)
 Uncle-in-law - Yi Hyang, Munjong of Joseon (조선 문종) (15 November 1415 - 1 June 1452)
 Unnamed niece (옹주) (1441 - 1444)
 Issue 
 Son - Hong Baek-gyeong (홍백경, 洪伯慶) (1471 - ?)
 Daughter-in-law - Lady Yi (정경부인 이씨)
 Daughter-in-law - Lady Ha of the Jinju Ha clan (정경부인 진주 하씨)
 Granddaughter - Lady Hong of the Namyang Hong clan (남양 홍씨)
 Grandson-in-law - Shin Hong-pil (신홍필, 愼弘弼)

References

15th-century Korean people
15th-century Korean women
1456 births
1482 deaths
Princesses of Joseon